Penn State Nittany Lions  

Patrick Durkin Cummins (born November 16, 1980) is an American retired mixed martial artist who formerly competed in the Light heavyweight division of the Ultimate Fighting Championship. A professional competitor since 2010, he has formerly competed for Strikeforce.

Mixed martial arts career

Early career 
Cummins played many sports, including wrestling and football, while at Warwick High School (Pennsylvania). As a college wrestler for Penn State University, Cummins was a two time NCAA Division I All-American, finishing 4th and 2nd at the 2003 and 2004 National Championships respectively and 2004 runner-up as well as a two-time US National Team Member.

Cummins transitioned to mixed martial arts in 2010 after pleading guilty to felony burglary. He made his professional debut on December 4, 2010, facing Terrell Brown at Strikeforce: Henderson vs. Babalu II. Cummins won his debut fight by first round TKO but his fight career stalled after he was sentenced to jail.

Cummins fought Tasi Edwards at ProElite 3 on January 21, 2012. He won the fight via arm-triangle.

Cummins then fought Ricky Pulu at Xplode Fight Series: Revancha on March 16, 2013. He won via first round TKO.

In what would be his last fight before signing with UFC, Cummins faced Willie Smalls at SCL: Chaos in the Cage on May 18, 2013. Cummins won via guillotine choke submission.

Ultimate Fighting Championship
In February 2014, Cummins replaced the injured Rashad Evans against Daniel Cormier on February 22, 2014, at UFC 170.  He lost the fight by first round TKO.

For his second fight with the promotion, Cummins was scheduled to fight Francimar Barroso on June 7, 2014 at UFC Fight Night 42. However, Barroso was forced out of the bout due to an injury and replaced by promotional newcomer Roger Narvaez.  Cummins won the fight via second round TKO.

Cummins faced Kyle Kingsbury on July 26, 2014 at UFC on Fox 12. He won the fight via unanimous decision.

Cummins faced Antônio Carlos Júnior on December 20, 2014 at UFC Fight Night 58. He won the fight by unanimous decision.

Cummins faced Ovince Saint Preux on April 18, 2015 at UFC on Fox 15. He lost the fight via knockout in the first round.

Cummins faced Rafael Cavalcante on August 1, 2015 at UFC 190. He won the fight via TKO due to elbows in the third round.

Cummins faced Glover Teixeira on November 7, 2015 at UFC Fight Night 77. He lost the fight via TKO in the second round.

Cummins next faced Antônio Rogério Nogueira on May 14, 2016 at UFC 198. He lost the fight via TKO in the first round.

Cummins was expected to face Gian Villante on December 9, 2016 at UFC Fight Night 102. However, Cummins pulled out of the fight on December 2 citing a staph infection. He was replaced by promotional newcomer Saparbek Safarov.

Cummins faced Jan Błachowicz on April 8, 2017 at UFC 210. He won the bout by majority decision.

A rescheduled bout with Gian Villante eventually took place on July 22, 2017 at UFC on Fox 25. Cummins won the back-and-forth fight via split decision.

Cummins faced Corey Anderson on November 4, 2017 at UFC 217. However on October 17, Cummins pulled out from the fight due to a resistant staph infection.  The fight was rescheduled to UFC Fight Night 128 on April 21, 2018. He lost the fight via unanimous decision.

Cummins faced Misha Cirkunov on October 27, 2018 at UFC Fight Night 138. He lost the fight by submission in the first round via an arm triangle choke.

Cummins faced Ed Herman on May 18, 2019 at UFC Fight Night 152. He lost the fight via TKO in the first round.

Cummins announced his retirement from the sport on December 24, 2019.

Mixed martial arts record

|Loss
|align=center|10–7
|Ed Herman
|TKO (knee and punches)
|UFC Fight Night: dos Anjos vs. Lee 
|
|align=center|1
|align=center|3:39
|Rochester, New York, United States
|
|-
|Loss
|align=center| 10–6
|Misha Cirkunov
|Submission (arm-triangle choke)
|UFC Fight Night: Volkan vs. Smith 
|
|align=center|1
|align=center|2:40
|Moncton, New Brunswick, Canada
|
|- 
|Loss
|align=center|10–5
|Corey Anderson
|Decision (unanimous)
|UFC Fight Night: Barboza vs. Lee
|
|align=center|3
|align=center|5:00
|Atlantic City, New Jersey, United States
|
|-
|Win
|align=center|10–4
|Gian Villante
|Decision (split)
|UFC on Fox: Weidman vs. Gastelum 
|
|align=center|3
|align=center|5:00
|Uniondale, New York, United States
|
|-
|Win
|align=center|9–4
|Jan Błachowicz
|Decision (majority)
|UFC 210
|
|align=center|3
|align=center|5:00
|Buffalo, New York, United States
|
|-
|Loss
|align=center|8–4
|Antônio Rogério Nogueira
|TKO (punches)
|UFC 198
|
|align=center|1
|align=center|4:52
|Curitiba, Brazil
| 
|-
|Loss
|align=center|8–3
|Glover Teixeira
|TKO (punches)
|UFC Fight Night: Belfort vs. Henderson 3
|
|align=center|2
|align=center|1:12
|São Paulo, Brazil
|
|-
|Win
|align=center|8–2
|Rafael Cavalcante
|TKO (elbows)
|UFC 190
|
|align=center|3
|align=center|0:45
|Rio de Janeiro, Brazil
|
|-
|Loss
|align=center|7–2
|Ovince Saint Preux
|KO (punches)
|UFC on Fox: Machida vs. Rockhold 
|
|align=center|1
|align=center|4:54
|Newark, New Jersey, United States
|
|-
|Win
|align=center|7–1
|Antônio Carlos Júnior
|Decision (unanimous)
|UFC Fight Night: Machida vs. Dollaway 
|
|align=center|3
|align=center|5:00
|Barueri, Brazil
|
|-
|Win
|align=center| 6–1
|Kyle Kingsbury
|Decision (unanimous)
|UFC on Fox: Lawler vs. Brown 
|
|align=center|3
|align=center|5:00
|San Jose, California, United States
|
|-
|Win
|align=center| 5–1
|Roger Narvaez
| TKO (punches)
|UFC Fight Night: Henderson vs. Khabilov
|
|align=center| 2
|align=center| 2:28
|Albuquerque, New Mexico, United States
|
|-
|Loss
|align=center| 4–1
|Daniel Cormier
|TKO (punches)
|UFC 170
|
|align=center| 1
|align=center| 1:19
|Las Vegas, Nevada, United States
|
|-
|Win
|align=center| 4–0
|Willie Smalls
|Submission (guillotine choke)
|Sparta Combat League: Chaos in the Cage
|
|align=center| 1
|align=center| 3:19
|Denver, Colorado, United States
|
|-
|Win
|align=center| 3–0
|Ricky Pulu
|TKO (punches)
|Xplode Fight Series: Revancha
|
|align=center| 1
|align=center| 1:07
|Valley Center, California, United States
|
|-
|Win
|align=center| 2–0
|Tasi Edwards
|Submission (arm-triangle choke)
|ProElite 3: Da Spyder vs. Minowaman
|
|align=center| 1
|align=center| 4:01
|Honolulu, Hawaii, United States
|
|-
|Win
|align=center| 1–0
|Terrell Brown
|TKO (punches)
|Strikeforce: Henderson vs. Babalu II
|
|align=center| 1
|align=center| 2:44
|St. Louis, Missouri, United States
|
|-

See also
 List of current UFC fighters
 List of male mixed martial artists

References

External links
 
 

Living people
American male mixed martial artists
Light heavyweight mixed martial artists
Mixed martial artists utilizing collegiate wrestling
Sportspeople from Pennsylvania
1980 births
Penn State Nittany Lions wrestlers
People from Doylestown, Pennsylvania
Ultimate Fighting Championship male fighters